David Humphrey Rivers Ker (born 11 October 1982) is a British actor, writer, comedian and football executive, who is a member of the sketch comedy troupe The Penny Dreadfuls.

Early life and education 
Ker was born to David Peter James Ker, a fine art dealer, and Alexandra Mary, daughter of Vice-Admiral Sir Dymock Watson. He is also a descendant on his father's side of the politician Henry Howard, 18th Earl of Suffolk.

Ker is 6'7" (2.01 m) tall. He was educated at Eton College, and read history at the University of Edinburgh. During his time at the University of Edinburgh, Ker performed in Edinburgh University Theatre Company pantomime productions. Ker performed with fellow students David Reed and Thom Tuck as a member of this comedy troupe.

Career 
In 2006, Ker, together with Reed and Tuck, formed The Penny Dreadfuls, who have performed their Victorian sketch shows across Britain, including at The Edinburgh Festival Fringe with Aeneas Faversham in 2006 and Aeneas Faversham Returns in 2007. Since then, he has appeared in Comedy Shuffle for BBC Three and the short film I am Bob, starring Bob Geldof. Ker was also co-anchor on the short-lived internet-based satirical news programme Log.tv. with Rufus Hound.

The Penny Dreadfuls radio series The Brothers Faversham was first broadcast on BBC 7 in early January 2008. The second series, More Brothers Faversham, was aired in October 2008 and later repeated on Radio 4. The trio also wrote and starred in a 2010 comedy drama for BBC Radio 4 about Guy Fawkes. More recently, Ker has been working increasingly as a solo artist. He was a regular in the improvisational comedy show Fast and Loose, hosted by Hugh Dennis in early 2011. Later that year, he appeared as part of the 24 Hour Panel People charity show hosted by David Walliams for Red Nose Day 2011, in the Whose Line Is It Anyway? section. He has also appeared on 8 Out of 10 Cats, and in August 2013, on the show's crossover with Countdown. He is set to appear as a regular in BBC3 show Live at The Electric.

In August 2011 Ker presented a feature-length debut solo show at Edinburgh Fringe Festival entitled Humphrey Ker is...Dymock Watson: Nazi Smasher!, for which he won the Edinburgh Comedy Award (formerly Perrier Award) for "Best Newcomer". The show was loosely based on the real-life story of his grandfather, Dymock Watson, who was a Special Operations Executive agent in WWII. Ker has performed  Dymock Watson: Nazi Smasher! at London's Soho Theatre, the West End's Fortune Theatre and in Los Angeles at the Upright Citizens Brigade Theatre.

Ker has appeared as a guest on various BBC Radio 4 shows, including It's Your Round with Angus Deayton, Sandi Toksvig and Milton Jones and Dilemma with Sue Perkins, Phill Jupitus and Susan Calman. He is the host of the upcoming BBC Radio 4 sketch show Sketcherama. In April 2012 Ker appeared as a panelist on BBC's Have I Got News for You, in May 2013, on the BBC Radio 4 show The News Quiz, and in August 2013 on 8 out of 10 Cats Does Countdown. Ker also guest-starred on the NBC comedy Sean Saves the World in January 2014.

In 2013, Ker was the Curator in series 6 of the BBC Radio 4 comedy panel game The Museum of Curiosity.

In 2018, Ker was cast in the reboot of Greatest American Hero for ABC, and appeared in an episode of It's Always Sunny in Philadelphia.

In February 2021, Ker was announced as Executive Director at Welsh football club Wrexham AFC following the takeover by Rob McElhenney and Ryan Reynolds.

In December 2021, Ker began playing the part of Elliot on the NBC sitcom American Auto.

Ker appears in the Apple TV+ original show Mythic Quest, which was co-created by his wife, Megan Ganz.

References

External links 

 
 PBJ Artist Page

Living people
British male stage actors
British male comedians
People educated at Eton College
Alumni of the University of Edinburgh
1982 births
British male radio actors
British male television actors